Thrust reversal, also called reverse thrust, is the temporary diversion of an aircraft engine's thrust for it to act against the forward travel of the aircraft, providing deceleration.  Thrust reverser systems are featured on many jet aircraft to help slow down just after touch-down, reducing wear on the brakes and enabling shorter landing distances. Such devices affect the aircraft significantly and are considered important for safe operations by airlines. There have been accidents involving thrust reversal systems, including fatal ones.

Reverse thrust is also available on many propeller-driven aircraft through reversing the controllable-pitch propellers to a negative angle. The equivalent concept for a ship is called astern propulsion.

Principle and uses

A landing roll consists of touchdown, bringing the aircraft to taxi speed, and eventually to a complete stop.  However, most commercial jet engines continue to produce thrust in the forward direction, even when idle, acting against the deceleration of the aircraft. The brakes of the landing gear of most modern aircraft are sufficient in normal circumstances to stop the aircraft by themselves, but for safety purposes, and to reduce the stress on the brakes, another deceleration method is needed. In scenarios involving bad weather, where factors like snow or rain on the runway reduce the effectiveness of the brakes, and in emergencies like rejected takeoffs, this need is more pronounced.

A simple and effective method is to reverse the direction of the exhaust stream of the jet engine and use the power of the engine itself to decelerate. Ideally, the reversed exhaust stream would be directed straight forward. However, for aerodynamic reasons, this is not possible, and a 135° angle is taken, resulting in less effectiveness than would otherwise be possible. Thrust reversal can also be used in flight to reduce airspeed, though this is not common with modern aircraft. There are three common types of thrust reversing systems used on jet engines: the target, clam-shell, and cold stream systems. Some propeller-driven aircraft equipped with variable-pitch propellers can reverse thrust by changing the pitch of their propeller blades. Most commercial jetliners have such devices, and it also has applications in military aviation.

Types of thrust reversal systems
Small aircraft typically do not have thrust reversal systems, except in specialized applications. On the other hand, large aircraft (those weighing more than 12,500 lb) almost always have the ability to reverse thrust. Reciprocating engine, turboprop and jet aircraft can all be designed to include thrust reversal systems.

Propeller-driven aircraft

Propeller-driven aircraft generate reverse thrust by changing the angle of their controllable-pitch propellers so that the propellers direct their thrust forward. This reverse thrust feature became available with the development of controllable-pitch propellers, which change the angle of the propeller blades to make efficient use of engine power over a wide range of conditions. Reverse thrust is created when the propeller pitch angle is reduced from fine to negative. This is called the beta position.

Piston-engine aircraft tend not to have reverse thrust, however turboprop aircraft generally do. Examples include the PAC P-750 XSTOL, Cessna 208 Caravan, and Pilatus PC-6 Porter.

One special application of reverse thrust comes in its use on multi-engine seaplanes and flying boats. These aircraft, when landing on water, have no conventional braking method and must rely on slaloming and/or reverse thrust, as well as the drag of the water in order to slow or stop. In addition, reverse thrust is often necessary for maneuvering on the water, where it is used to make tight turns or even propel the aircraft in reverse, maneuvers which may prove necessary for leaving a dock or beach.

Jet aircraft

On aircraft using jet engines, thrust reversal is accomplished by causing the jet blast to flow forward. The engine does not run or rotate in reverse; instead, thrust reversing devices are used to block the blast and redirect it forward. High bypass ratio engines usually reverse thrust by changing the direction of only the fan airflow, since the majority of thrust is generated by this section, as opposed to the core. There are three jet engine thrust reversal systems in common use:

External types

The target thrust reverser uses a pair of hydraulically operated bucket or clamshell type doors to reverse the hot gas stream. For forward thrust, these doors form the propelling nozzle of the engine. In the original implementation of this system on the Boeing 707, and still common today, two reverser buckets were hinged so when deployed they block the rearward flow of the exhaust and redirect it with a forward component. This type of reverser is visible at the rear of the engine during deployment.

Internal types

Internal thrust reversers use deflector doors inside the engine shroud to redirect airflow through openings in the side of the nacelle. In turbojet and mixed-flow bypass turbofan engines, one type uses pneumatically operated clamshell deflectors to redirect engine exhaust. The reverser ducts may be fitted with cascade vanes to further redirect the airflow forward.

In contrast to the two types used on turbojet and low-bypass turbofan engines, many high-bypass turbofan engines use a cold-stream reverser. This design places the deflector doors in the bypass duct to redirect only the portion of the airflow from the engine's fan section that bypasses the combustion chamber. Engines such as the A320 and A340 versions of the CFM56 direct the airflow forward with a pivoting-door reverser similar to the internal clamshell used in some turbojets. Cascade reversers use a vane cascade that is uncovered by a sleeve around the perimeter of the engine nacelle that slides aft by means of an air motor. During normal operation, the reverse thrust vanes are blocked. On selection, the system folds the doors to block off the cold stream final nozzle and redirect this airflow to the cascade vanes. 

In cold-stream reversers, the exhaust from the combustion chamber continues to generate forward thrust, making this design less effective. It can also redirect core exhaust flow if equipped with a hot stream spoiler. The cold stream cascade system is known for structural integrity, reliability and versatility, but can be heavy and difficult to integrate into nacelles housing large engines.

Operation

In most cockpit setups, reverse thrust is set when the thrust levers are on idle by pulling them farther back. Reverse thrust is typically applied immediately after touchdown, often along with spoilers, to improve deceleration early in the landing roll when residual aerodynamic lift and high speed limit the effectiveness of the brakes located on the landing gear. Reverse thrust is always selected manually, either using levers attached to the thrust levers or moving the thrust levers into a reverse thrust 'gate'.

The early deceleration provided by reverse thrust can reduce landing roll by a quarter or more. Regulations dictate, however, that an aircraft must be able to land on a runway without the use of thrust reversal in order to be certified to land there as part of scheduled airline service.

Once the aircraft's speed has slowed, reverse thrust is shut down to prevent the reversed airflow from throwing debris in front of the engine intakes where it can be ingested, causing foreign object damage. If circumstances require it, reverse thrust can be used all the way to a stop, or even to provide thrust to push the aircraft backward, though aircraft tugs or towbars are more commonly used for that purpose. When reverse thrust is used to push an aircraft back from the gate, the maneuver is called a powerback. Some manufacturers warn against the use of this procedure during icy conditions as using reverse thrust on snow- or slush-covered ground can cause slush, water, and runway deicers to become airborne and adhere to wing surfaces.

If the full power of reverse thrust is not desirable, thrust reverse can be operated with the throttle set at less than full power, even down to idle power, which reduces stress and wear on engine components. Reverse thrust is sometimes selected on idling engines to eliminate residual thrust, in particular in icy or slick conditions, or when the engines' jet blast could cause damage.

In-flight operation

Some aircraft, notably some Russian and Soviet aircraft, are able to safely use reverse thrust in flight, though the majority of these are propeller-driven. Many commercial aircraft, however, cannot. In-flight use of reverse thrust has several advantages. It allows for rapid deceleration, enabling quick changes of speed. It also prevents the speed build-up normally associated with steep dives, allowing for rapid loss of altitude, which can be especially useful in hostile environments such as combat zones, and when making steep approaches to land.

The Douglas DC-8 series of airliners has been certified for in-flight reverse thrust since service entry in 1959. Safe and effective for facilitating quick descents at acceptable speeds, it nonetheless produced significant aircraft buffeting, so actual use was less common on passenger flights and more common on cargo and ferry flights, where passenger comfort is not a concern.

The Hawker Siddeley Trident, a 120- to 180-seat airliner, was capable of descending at up to 10,000 ft/min (3,050 m/min) by use of reverse thrust, though this capability was rarely used.

The Concorde supersonic airliner could use reverse thrust in the air to increase the rate of descent. Only the inboard engines were used, and the engines were placed in reverse idle only in subsonic flight and when the aircraft was below  in altitude.

The Boeing C-17 Globemaster III is one of the few modern aircraft that uses reverse thrust in flight. The Boeing-manufactured aircraft is capable of in-flight deployment of reverse thrust on all four engines to facilitate steep tactical descents up to 15,000 ft/min (4,600 m/min) into combat environments (a descent rate of just over 170 mph, or 274 km/h). The Lockheed C-5 Galaxy, introduced in 1969, also has in-flight reverse capability, although on the inboard engines only.

The Saab 37 Viggen (retired in November 2005) also had the ability to use reverse thrust both before landing, to shorten the needed runway, and taxiing after landing, allowing many Swedish roads to double as wartime runways.

The Shuttle Training Aircraft, a highly modified Grumman Gulfstream II, used reverse thrust in flight to help simulate Space Shuttle aerodynamics so astronauts could practice landings. A similar technique was employed on a modified Tupolev Tu-154 which simulated the Russian Buran space shuttle.

Effectiveness
The amount of thrust and power generated are proportional to the speed of the aircraft, making reverse thrust more effective at high speeds. For maximum effectiveness, it should be applied quickly after touchdown. If activated at low speeds, foreign object damage is possible. There is some danger of an aircraft with thrust reversers applied momentarily leaving the ground again due to both the effect of the reverse thrust and the nose-up pitch effect from the spoilers. For aircraft susceptible to such an occurrence, pilots must take care to achieve a firm position on the ground before applying reverse thrust. If applied before the nose-wheel is in contact with the ground, there is a chance of asymmetric deployment causing an uncontrollable yaw towards the side of higher thrust, as steering the aircraft with the nose wheel is the only way to maintain control of the direction of travel in this situation.

Reverse thrust mode is used only for a fraction of aircraft operating time but affects it greatly in terms of design, weight, maintenance, performance, and cost. Penalties are significant but necessary since it provides stopping force for added safety margins, directional control during landing rolls, and aids in rejected take-offs and ground operations on contaminated runways where normal braking effectiveness is diminished. Airlines consider thrust reverser systems a vital part of reaching a maximum level of aircraft operating safety.

Thrust reversal-related accidents and incidents
In-flight deployment of reverse thrust has directly contributed to the crashes of several transport-type aircraft:
 On 4 July 1966 an Air New Zealand Douglas DC-8-52 with the registration ZK-NZB crashed on takeoff on a routine training flight from Auckland International Airport due to reverse thrust applied during a simulated failure of no.4 engine on takeoff . The crash killed 2 of the 5 crew on board.[1] 
 On 11 February 1978, Pacific Western Airlines Flight 314, a Boeing 737-200, crashed while executing a rejected landing at Cranbrook Airport. The left thrust reverser had not properly stowed; it deployed during the climbout, causing the aircraft to roll to the left and strike the ground. Out of 5 crew members and 44 passengers, only 6 passengers and a flight attendant survived.
On 9 February 1982, Japan Airlines Flight 350 crashed  short of the runway at Tokyo Haneda Airport following the intentional deployment of reverse thrust on two of the Douglas DC-8's four engines by the mentally unstable captain, resulting in 24 passenger deaths.
On 29 August 1990, a United States Air Force Lockheed C-5 Galaxy crashed shortly after take-off from Ramstein Air Base in Germany. As the aircraft started to climb off the runway, one of the thrust reversers suddenly deployed. This resulted in loss of control of the aircraft and the subsequent crash. Of the 17 people on board, 4 survived the crash.
On 26 May 1991, Lauda Air Flight 004, a Boeing 767-300ER, had an uncommanded deployment of the left engine's thrust reverser, which caused the airliner to go into a rapid dive and break up in mid-air. All 213 passengers and 10 crew were killed.
On 31 October 1996, TAM Linhas Aéreas Flight 402, a Fokker 100, crashed shortly after take-off from Congonhas-São Paulo International Airport, São Paulo, Brazil, striking two apartment buildings and several houses. All 90 passengers and 6 crew members as well as 3 people on the ground died in the crash. The crash was attributed to the un-commanded deployment of a faulty thrust reverser on the right engine shortly after take-off.
 On 10 February 2004, Kish Air Flight 7170, a Fokker 50, crashed while on approach to Sharjah International Airport. A total of 43 out of the 46 passengers and crew on board were killed. Investigators determined that the pilots had prematurely set the propellers to reverse thrust mode, causing them to lose control of the aircraft.
 On 17 July 2007, TAM Linhas Aéreas Flight 3054, an Airbus A320 crashed after landing on Congonhas-São Paulo International Airport, São Paulo, Brazil, hitting a Shell Gas station, cars, and finally the TAM Express building, killing a total of 199 people, 187 aboard the plane and 12 on the ground, leaving no survivors. An inoperative thrust reverser was one of the many causes for the accident.

See also
Afterburner
Thrust vectoring
Vertical take-off and landing

References

External links

 Reducing Landing Distance
 "Power Jets thrust spoiler which can give negative thrust for braking" – a 1945 Flight article on new engine developments showing a Power Jets reverse thrust device

Aircraft controls
Jet engine technology
Aircraft propulsion components
Articles containing video clips